Club Deportivo Llosetense is a Spanish football team based in Lloseta, Majorca, in the autonomous community of Balearic Islands. Founded in 1944, it plays in Tercera División – Group 11, holding home matches at Estadio Municipal de Lloseta.

History 
The club was founded on September 2, 1944 with Campo de Son Batle as its first stadium.

Season to season

1 season in Segunda División B
14 seasons in Tercera División

References

External links
La Preferente team profile 
ArefePedia team profile 
Soccerway team profile

Football clubs in the Balearic Islands
Sport in Mallorca
Association football clubs established in 1944
1944 establishments in Spain